John Nelson was an American Negro league baseball pitcher from the 1880s to the 1900s.

Nelson made his Negro league debut in 1887 for the New York Gorhams, and played for New York again the following season. He went on to play several seasons for the Cuban Giants and Cuban X-Giants through 1908.

References

External links
 and Seamheads

Year of birth missing
Year of death missing
Place of birth missing
Place of death missing
Baseball pitchers
Cuban Giants players
Cuban X-Giants players
New York Gorhams players
Philadelphia Giants players